Urodolichus is a genus of fly in the family Dolichopodidae. It is known from the Afrotropical realm (Seychelles and Madagascar), Indomalayan realm and Australasian realm (New Guinea). It has been placed in either Rhaphiinae or Diaphorinae, though Grichanov & Brooks (2017) consider the genus to be incertae sedis within the family Dolichopodidae.

Species
Urodolichus artifacies (Grootaert & Meuffels, 1990)
Urodolichus caudatus Lamb, 1922
Urodolichus gracilis Lamb, 1922
Urodolichus iulilamellatus (Wei, 2006)
Urodolichus javanus (De Meijere, 1916)
Urodolichus keiseri (Hollis, 1964)
Urodolichus kubani (Olejníček, 2002)
Urodolichus lambi Grichanov, 1998
Urodolichus ninae Grichanov, 1998
Urodolichus porphyropoides Lamb, 1922
Urodolichus villosiceps Grichanov, Capellari & Bickel, 2016

References

Dolichopodidae genera
Diptera of Africa
Diptera of Asia
Diptera of Australasia